The Precision 13 is an American single-handed sailing dinghy that was designed by Stephen Seaton as a racer and first built in 1985.

Production
The design was built by Precision Boat Works in Palmetto, Florida, United States, starting in 1985, but it is now out of production.

Design
The Precision 13 is a recreational sailboat, built predominantly of fiberglass, with aluminum spars. It has a catboat rig, a raked stem, a plumb transom, a transom-hung rudder controlled by a tiller and a retractable daggerboard. It displaces .

See also
List of sailing boat types

Similar sailboats
 Laser (dinghy)

References

External links
Photo of a Precision 13 sailing

   

Dinghies
1980s sailboat type designs
Sailing yachts
Sailboat type designs by Stephen Seaton
Sailboat types built by Precision Boat Works